The following is a list of characters from Maoyu.

Characters
None of the characters in the story have proper names, and each one of them are only being addressed by their title or occupation.

Protagonists

The main female protagonist and the 43rd supreme ruler of the Demon Realm who holds the title of Demon Queen. Even though she looks young, she is in fact over a hundred years old. She wants the best outcome for both sides of the war and sets out for the Human Realm after successfully convincing the Hero to join forces via revealing her plans. She comes from a clan of demons that prioritize knowledge. They reside in a hidden dimension called the Outer Library, which contains a vast archive of knowledge from various times and alternate universes. That place is where the Queen gains her range of knowledge.

The Crimson Scholar rapidly grows in popularity from both her radical ideas and beauty. She is viewed with distrust by the church and the central kingdoms, who brand her as a heretic out of fear that it would loosen its grasp over the countries helped by her. To ensure a temporary ceasefire between the Humans and Demons, the Demon Queen disseminates rumors that her battle with the Hero indeed occurred as expected, resulting in his disappearance and her body becoming severely wounded. This provides her with extra time to complete her plans by leading her servants to believe that she cannot command them until her recuperation is completed.

Though an imposing and intelligent woman, she has shown a bit of a childish and comedic side. To appear more threatening, she wears a headband with a large set of horns. The Demon Queen has always held affections for the Hero and anticipated their meeting from the moment of his birth. One part of becoming the Demon King involves a transfer of emotion and power from the past Demon Kings in the Ancient Royal Tomb. However, the spirits of the past Kings possess her body when she attempts the ritual for a second time, and she is rescued by Hero forcing the spirits out of her body by affirming their vow together.

The main male protagonist and the greatest warrior that the Human Realm has. After traveling with his companions, he went out on his own to slay the Demon Queen and bring an end to the conflict between demons and humans. However, he agrees to aid her efforts after she explains that the world needs a peaceful solution for both sides, as both societies are set to collapse further once the war ends. He is an unparalleled swordsman capable of standing against the strongest Human or Demon. He is capable of powerful magic ranging from healing abilities to creating familiar spirits, as well as instantly teleporting to any location he has previously visited. He eventually develops feelings for the Demon Queen, even though she only returns them in an over-the-top fashion.

As part of the Queen's plan, he conceals his true identity and adopts the name of  while living in a small village with The Crimson Scholar. The Hero used to fight alongside three companions, a Female Knight, an Archer and a Wizard who followed their separate ways after the Hero left the party to confront the Demon King by himself.

Hero's companions

One of the members of Hero's old party. A powerful swordswoman who also excels as a commander in battle. After the party is disbanded, she became a nun and Prioress at the Lakeside Convent in Lake nation. She reunites with the Hero by accident much to her surprise, as no one had news from him since he left for the Demon Realm. Despite failing to get a proper explanation from him, she joins the Crimson Scholar's efforts to improve Human society by teaching swordsmanship to her students. Female Knight eventually becomes a close friend to the Crimson Scholar, staying by her side even after learning about her true identity, despite the fact she is also in love with Hero.

Another member of the Hero's old party. After the Hero left his party, she sets for the Demon Realm to look for him and no one has heard from her since then. Upon learning of it, the Hero starts looking for clues about her whereabouts during his travels through the Demon Realm. Her adventures in the Demon Realm are told in the manga Maoyū Maō Yūsha Gaiden. Later, she reveals herself as a demon from same clan as the Demon Queen and Chief Maid. She has split personalities, shown as invisible companions in the anime that can only be seen by her but manifest themselves through a change in her tone of voice to others.

In the spin off manga and prequel light novels, it is revealed she was formerly known as the Silver Mage and along with her older sisters, White Mage and Indigo Mage, they were part of an experiment by Mage Association and the Central Church to create an artificial hero. However, the brutal training left many dead with Female Magician being the only survivor after escaping while her sisters spirits inhabit her body, becoming her split personalities.

Later 

The third member of Hero's old party. After the party was disbanded, he starts working as a servant of the Winter Prince who later becomes King. He is a lecherous older man who usually treats Hero like a son, while taunting Female Knight for her small bust, much to her anger. He addresses concerns about Hero isolating himself from humanity due to his immense power. His title comes from the fact that he can inflict arrow-like wounds from afar, despite he is never seen carrying a bow or any kind of long range weapon.

Winter Pass village

Demon Queen's most trusted servant and commander of her army. She usually does not refrain from expressing her point of view even before her master. Despite making unflattering comments to her master, she remains loyal to her master ever since they were children. Like her master, she also comes from the same demon clan that resides in the Outer Library but instead learning about economics, she learns the "Ways of the Maid" from peculiar sources. She can summon  to guard the mansion and serve the guests with her.

Two young sisters who took refuge at Crimson Scholar's estate. Coming from a serf family of seven siblings, the sisters' other siblings died from hunger and disease. Due to the harsh life of serfdom which their lord treated them like slaves, they escaped and hope to get a better life at the city. However, Chief Maid looks down on the sisters since their presence would bring trouble with the Crimson Scholar. Furthermore, she considers them "insects" for allowing life harsh realities to control their fate rather than overcoming it and control their own lives as human beings and not thinking and planning their future.

Upon asking the Chief Maid to teach them to become proper humans, they are taken unto her guard, working as assistant maids. Thanks to the education given to them, Big Sister Maid becomes knowledgeable about the different lives and social classes of human society while Little Sister Maid becomes an expert with food and drinks. They learn the truth about Crimson Scholar and Chief Maid's demonic origin just before the beginning of the Kurultai and both accept it without much difficulty, with Big Sister Maid even taking on the disguise of the Crimson Scholar when Demon Queen has to be away.

A noble's son and student of Crimson Scholar's, thanks to his connections and knowledge taught to him by his teacher, he becomes a diplomat and spy for the Blizzard Queen. He later joins Young Merchant in his plan to take control of the Merchant Alliance.

A merchant's son and a student of Crimson Scholar's, thanks to his new knowledge of economics by his teacher, the Winter King appoints him as the country's finance minister.

A warrior's son and a student of Crimson Scholar's. He originally was hot-blooded and very supportive in the human/demon war but later changes his view due to his teacher and Female Knight who taught him about the effects of the war. When the Central nations began attacking the Southern kingdoms, he later becomes a commander in the Southern kingdom armies where he and his men thwarted a surprise attack by the White Nation using tactics and traps he learn from his teacher.

A muscular young builder and engineer demon boy living in Gateway Fortress after some time educated by Crimson Scholar. He is later entrusted to build the bridge through the hole linking human world and demon world.

An young minstrel elf-like demon girl living in Gateway Fortress after some time educated by Crimson Scholar. She later travels with the Elder Sister Maid to the Holy Kingdom's library.

Southern kingdoms

Formerly 

The current regent of the Winter Kingdom. Before his coronation, the Winter Prince wished for his country and the other Southern kingdoms to be free from the Central kingdoms who economically controls their nations by giving them financial aid in exchange for continuing fighting the demons. Knowing such aid is unreliable and cannot last forever, he was grateful for the Crimson Scholar in helping his nation prosper to be economically independent from Central. After his father was killed during the first disastrous expedition to reclaim Aurora Island, he assumed the throne to become the new Winter King and appointed Female Knight as the new Commander of the second expedition to reclaim the island. Thanks to her, Crimson Scholar and Hero, Aurora Island is reclaimed from the demons. To further help the South, he forms a economic pact with the Iron and Ice Kingdoms. After the Central Kingdoms and church brands Crimson Scholar a heretic in an attempt to stop the South from becoming economically independent, the Winter King offers his support and protection to her and stand up against the Central.

The original Winter King, he was killed by South Arctic General during the failed Aurora Island Expedition in order to buy time for the survivors to escape.

Queen of the Ice Kingdom.

King of the Iron Kingdom.

King of the White Night Kingdom. Unlike his Southern counterparts, which end up adopting the improvements offered by Crimson Scholar, he chooses to align with the Central kingdoms instead. Arrogant and uncaring, he refuse to take responsibility when his attempt to reclaim Aurora Island fails which led to many deaths, including the first Winter King who he tries to blame on his failure. After the rest of the Southern leaders call out on his behavior, he gives command of the next Aurora Island expedition to the new Winter King to see if he can do better but much to his anger, the Winter King succeeds in what he failed to do. With his kingdom being left out the economic pact between the Winter, Ice and Iron kingdoms, White Night King becomes jealous and swears revenge on the other Southern nations.

The former Commander of the Crusaders that controlled Gateway city and leader of White Night Kingdom's army. Under his rule, his Crusaders treated the demons harshly. As he and his Crusaders lost their sanity and morale due to the Black Knight and his allies' illusion magic, his army abandoned the city with the excuse that he was helping to reclaim Aurora Island. Unfortunately, he and his Crusaders were met by the demon armies who had controlled Aurora Island and were forced to retreat due to the Winter Kingdom forces. After a brutal battle, his whole army was wiped out, though the Commander himself was able to escape back to the Central Kingdoms. Nevertheless, he was arrested and sentenced to death by the Central Church for abandoning Gateway City and his crushing defeat at the hands of the demons. Later on he is secretly freed by his uncle, the White Night King, but not before losing one of his eyes to rats. He then joined his uncle's plan against the South. At the beginning of the war between Central and South, he led a cavalry surprise attack at the Iron Kingdom, only to be defeated by Warrior Youngster's forces. Escaping death again, he sneaked into Iron Kingdom's capital to murder Crimson Scholar who he blamed for all the bad things that happened to him. He attacks Big Sister Maid, who was disguised as the Scholar, but is confronted by the Warrior Youngster. After a fierce duel, the former Commander is killed, but not before cursing his enemies and predicting their downfall.

Merchants Alliance

A cunning business entrepreneur who views the Crimson Scholar's exploits as a means to expand his fortune. Eventually he learns from Hero about his and Demon Queen's plan and agrees to help them while taking the opportunity to further line his pockets. However, he has genuine feelings for the Crimson scholar which arose from their first encounter due to her intelligence, beauty, and shrewdness and even proposed to her, though learns and understands that the Hero holds a special place in her heart.

 
The Young Merchant's assistant.

Young Merchant's mentor.

Central kingdoms

The younger brother of the King of the Holy Kingdom.

The newly elected Pope of the Central Church after Aurora island is reclaimed from the Demons. He is a fanatic with deep hatred against demons.

Demon realm

Leader of the Fairy Clan.

One of Hero's allies in the Demon Realm. After Hero's helps rescue her Queen from the Wolf Clan, she and her fellow faeries assist Hero to reclaim Gateway City from the human Crusaders.

Leader of the Fire Dragon clan. The Archduke is a proud warrior and a war hawk who wants to reclaim Gateway city, seeing the humans continuing control of the city as an insult to the demons and their honor. However, he is convinced to let the Black Knight reclaim the city after the latter promises the city will be returned to the demons with no bloodshed.

Archduke Fire Dragon's daughter who is offered to Black Knight/Hero as his wife or mistress if he manages to reclaim Gateway city. After the city is reclaimed, she becomes a member of the city's ruling council.

Gateway City

A mercenary general who controls the Eastern Fortress of Gateway City. Unlike the Crusaders, he and his men treat the demons of Gateway city well. When the Commander of the Crusaders abandons the city, the General refuses to join him to protect the humans living there. Knowing he and his men don't have the numbers the fight the demon army, he peacefully surrenders to the Black Knight and forms a power sharing government between the city's humans and demons influential leaders.

The East Fortress General's second in command.

Blue Demon clan

The leader of the Blue Demon Clan who is working in cahoots with the Central Nations of the Human World and the church to take advantage of the war to strengthen their positions.

Formerly 

Blue Demon Lord's son whose body was possessed by the spirits of the Ancient Demon Lords after Hero forced them out of the Demon Queen's body, and intended to make use of them to usurp her position and become the new Demon Lord. After a failed attempt to assassinate Demon Queen, he loses the trust of other clans and flee with his companions. Possessing the powers of the Ancient Demon Lords, Blue Demon Son's strength is on par with Hero's, injuring him badly after a fight between them.

Beast Fang clan

The tiger lord of Beast Fang clan.

A Walrus-headed demon of tremendous size and power, head of the demon garrison in Aurora Island. As one of the ten strongest warriors in the Demon Realm, he leads several water demon clans whose advantage over the sea prevents the humans reclaiming Aurora Island. While a Glory seeker who does not respects the Demon Queen who he sees as weak, he has respects for those who duel him with honor like the first Winter King which he fought and promises the King before his death that he will spare and let go the surviving forces of the 1st Aurora island Expedition fleet. During the Humans 2nd attempt to reclaim the island, Female Knight and Crimson Scholar manages to take away South Arctic General's forces advantage over the sea by building a land bridge made of ice, allowing the Winter kingdom army to fight the demons on equal terms. When his fortress is surrounded by both the Winter Kingdom forces and the retreating Crusader armies from Gateway city, he realizes they cannot win and orders his army to return to the Demon Realm while he goes to fight the humans alone. He is killed by Female Knight after she accepts his duel to the death and dies knowing he fought a skilled warrior honorably.

Other clans
There are other four clans in demon realm, namely Humanoid clan, Ogre clan, Machine clan and Giant clan.

Chief of the Humanoid clan.

Princess of the Ogre clan.

Head of the Machine clan.

Head of the Giant clan.

Others

A young boy who becomes Merchant Youngster's assistant after the latter becomes the Winter Kingdom's Finance Minister.

Hero's familiar.

Notes

References

Maoyu